Karisavayal is a village in the Pattukkottai taluk of Thanjavur district, Tamil Nadu, India. There is a Government High School IN Karisavayal. Telephone Exchange under the name Karisavayal was located at a kilometer cooperated karisavayal Border. A well cooperated Hindus and Muslims live together. Social worker are Lions Group Friends.

Demographics 
At the 2001 census, Karisavayal had a total population of 1205 with 590 males and 615 females. .

References 

Villages in Thanjavur district